Cory Vitiello (born 1979) is a Canadian restaurateur and chef. He is the head of culinary development at Cactus Club Cafe. Vitiello was a contestant on the show Chef in Your Ear.

Early life and education 
Vitiello was born and raised in Brantford, Ontario. He has two brothers. Monthly, his family would visit his Italian paternal grandparents in Fort Erie, Ontario. His interest in cooking started at an early age. When Vitiello was 7 years old, he requested an Easy-Bake Oven for Christmas. He graduated from Stratford Chefs School. He completed an apprenticeship at Scaramouche Restaurant in Toronto.

Career 
Vitiello is a restaurateur and chef. He worked as a sous-chef at Cecconi's in Melbourne in 2003 and as the chef de cuisine at Drake Hotel from 2004 to 2007. In 2009, he was voted best new chef in Toronto by EnRoute. He was the national spokesperson for Thermador in 2010 and 2011. He has opened three restaurants, Harbord Room, THR & Co. and Flock. Vitiello was a contestant on the show Chef in Your Ear. Vitiello is head of culinary development at Cactus Club Cafe.

Personal life 
Vitiello was in a relationship with Meghan Markle from 2014 to May 2016. In September 2018, Vitiello's partner, Martina Sorbara gave birth to their first son.

References

External links
 

1979 births
Living people
21st-century Canadian businesspeople
Businesspeople from Ontario
Canadian male chefs
Canadian people of Italian descent
Canadian restaurateurs
Canadian television chefs
People from Brantford